= Metochi, Serres =

Village in Central Macedonia, Greece

Kato Metochi or Metochi (Greek: Κάτω Μετόχι or Μετόχι) is a village suburb of the city of Serres in northern Greece. It lies some 5 km northeast of the city centre at a height of 100 m above sea level. The village is mostly active in animal husbandry and the production of dairy products. It features three churches, St. Demetrios in the village proper and two other, dedicated to St. Elijah and Panagia Vyssiani, in its vicinity.
